Thompson Peak is a peak (980 m) 5 nautical miles (9 km) south of Ringgold Knoll in the northwest end of Wilson Hills. It was plotted by ANARE (Australian National Antarctic Research Expeditions) from aerial photographs taken by U.S. Navy Operation Highjump (1946–47) and ANARE (1959). It was named by Antarctic Names Committee of Australia (ANCA) for R. H. J. Thompson, Administrative Officer of the Antarctic Division, Melbourne, second-in-command of several ANARE expeditions to the Antarctic.
 

Mountains of Oates Land